The name Don has been used for two tropical cyclones in the Atlantic Ocean. It replaced the name Dennis, which was retired after the 2005 season. 

 Tropical Storm Don (2011), weak tropical storm that made landfall on southern Texas. 
 Tropical Storm Don (2017), short-lived tropical storm that dissipated before reaching the Windward Islands. 

Atlantic hurricane set index articles